Linha do Porto à Póvoa e Famalicão (Porto to Póvoa and Famalicão Line) was a railway line in Portugal, which connected Porto-Trindade to Póvoa de Varzim and Famalicão. The first section, from Porto-Boavista to Senhora da Hora, was opened on 1 October 1875, having been the first narrow-gauge line in the country. It was completed on 12 June 1881.

See also 
 List of railway lines in Portugal
 History of rail transport in Portugal

References

Railway lines in Portugal
Railway lines opened in 1875